Young Love EP is the debut EP by American dance-rock band Young Love. The EP was recorded in New York City, New York and features songwriting, production and vocals from musician Dan Keyes. The EP was released exclusively on iTunes on November 21, 2006 in the United States, and features the single "Discotech".

Track listing
 "Discotech" - 3:55
 "Tragedy" - 2:57
 "Discotech (Lindbergh Palace Radio Edit)" - 4:26
 "Discotech (Lindbergh Palace Remix)" - 3:51

References

External links
Official website

2006 debut EPs
Young Love (band) albums
ITunes-exclusive releases
Island Records EPs